The 2008 Dallas Cup was the 29th since its establishment, 12 teams entering in the tournament. The competition was sponsored by Dr Pepper. Liverpool beat UANL Tigres 3–0 in the Championship and won the 2008 Dallas Cup.

Standings

Bracket A

Bracket B

Bracket C

Semifinal

Championship

Top Scorer

External links 
 2008 Dr Pepper Dallas Cup XXIX

2008 in American soccer
Dallas Cup
Dallas Cup